Scott Selwood (born 27 March 1990) is a former professional Australian rules footballer who played for the West Coast Eagles and Geelong Football Club in the Australian Football League (AFL). As an Eagle, Selwood won a John Worsfold Medal in 2012, and was one of five acting captains at the club in the second half of the 2014 season after then-captain Darren Glass retired midway through the season. He moved to Geelong via free agency at the end of the 2015 season, playing alongside his brother and current Geelong captain Joel Selwood for a further four seasons. He is now playing senior football with the Ivanhoe Amateur football Club while also serving as an assistant coach at Collingwood Football Club.

Early life
Selwood grew up in Bendigo, Victoria, where he attended Catholic College Bendigo (now Catherine McAuley College). Selwood was recruited from the Bendigo Pioneers in the TAC Cup with 's fourth pick (number 22 overall) in the 2007 AFL draft.

AFL career

West Coast (2008–2015)
Selwood made his debut against  in the round 3 Western Derby in 2008. He played the following week against , but was dropped after a poor performance, obtaining only nine possessions. Selwood became a regular in the Eagles' line-up over the following three seasons, initially as a tagger, and later as an inside midfielder. He continued his outstanding form throughout the 2012 season, playing predominantly as a tagger and midfielder depending on the opposition. He capped off a stellar season by winning the John Worsfold Medal, ahead of teammates Dean Cox and Shannon Hurn.

When then-skipper Darren Glass announced his retirement immediately after round 12 of the 2014 season, Selwood, who had already shared acting captain duties with fellow vice-captain Josh Kennedy in the games that Glass had missed that season, was announced as one of several candidates who would rotate the captaincy for the remainder of the season.

Geelong (2016–2019)
Selwood missed most of the 2016 season with an ankle injury, but managed to return for the final five games of the season. Selwood managed to play 27 games over the following two seasons, displaying glimpses of the form that made him one of the best taggers in the competition and leading the competition in average tackles (10.7) in 2017.

At the end of the 2019 season, after managing only two appearances due to hamstring injuries, Selwood was delisted by Geelong.

Coaching career
Following his delisting from Geelong in 2019, Selwood joined  as a development coach.

Personal life
Selwood has three older brothers who have also played AFL football: twins Adam (who also played for West Coast) and Troy (who played for the ), and Joel, who is the most recent captain of Geelong, retiring after the end of the 2022 AFL Season. In June 2007, the Selwood brothers and their parents were named AFL celebrity ambassadors for Seeing Eye Dogs Australia.

Statistics

|- style="background:#EAEAEA"
| scope="row" text-align:center | 2008
| 
| 28 || 9 || 2 || 0 || 51 || 57 || 108 || 30 || 14 || 0.2 || 0.0 || 5.7 || 6.3 || 12.0 || 3.3 || 1.6 || 0
|-
| scope="row" text-align:center | 2009
| 
| 10 || 14 || 2 || 1 || 97 || 110 || 207 || 46 || 39 || 0.1 || 0.1 || 6.9 || 7.9 || 14.8 || 3.3 || 2.8 || 0
|- style="background:#EAEAEA"
| scope="row" text-align:center | 2010
| 
| 10 || 20 || 4 || 1 || 153 || 171 || 324 || 70 || 99 || 0.2 || 0.1 || 7.7 || 8.6 || 16.2 || 3.5 || 5.0 || 0
|-
| scope="row" text-align:center | 2011
| 
| 10 || 25 || 9 || 10 || 220 || 248 || 468 || 69 || bgcolor="CAE1FF" | 202† || 0.4 || 0.4 || 8.8 || 9.9 || 18.7 || 2.8 || bgcolor="CAE1FF" | 8.1† || 0
|- style="background:#EAEAEA"
| scope="row" text-align:center | 2012
| 
| 10 || 24 || 11 || 7 || 265 || 332 || 597 || 114 || 117 || 0.5 || 0.3 || 11.0 || 13.8 || 24.9 || 4.8 || 4.9 || 15
|-
| scope="row" text-align:center | 2013
| 
| 10 || 18 || 4 || 6 || 228 || 232 || 460 || 82 || 136 || 0.2 || 0.3 || 12.7 || 12.9 || 25.6 || 4.6 || bgcolor="CAE1FF" | 7.6† || 5
|- style="background:#EAEAEA"
| scope="row" text-align:center | 2014
| 
| 10 || 12 || 3 || 4 || 120 || 131 || 251 || 40 || 60 || 0.3 || 0.3 || 10.0 || 10.9 || 20.9 || 3.3 || 5.0 || 0
|-
| scope="row" text-align:center | 2015
| 
| 10 || 13 || 2 || 6 || 96 || 95 || 191 || 27 || 53 || 0.2 || 0.5 || 7.4 || 7.3 || 14.7 || 2.1 || 4.1 || 0
|- style="background:#EAEAEA"
| scope="row" text-align:center | 2016
| 
| 16 || 5 || 0 || 1 || 45 || 56 || 101 || 19 || 23 || 0.0 || 0.2 || 9.0 || 11.2 || 20.2 || 3.8 || 4.6 || 0
|-
| scope="row" text-align:center | 2017
| 
| 16 || 14 || 3 || 3 || 107 || 164 || 271 || 45 || 150 || 0.2 || 0.2 || 7.6 || 11.7 || 19.4 || 3.2 || bgcolor="CAE1FF" | 10.7† || 1
|- style="background:#EAEAEA"
| scope="row" text-align:center | 2018
| 
| 16 || 13 || 3 || 1 || 80 || 135 || 215 || 40 || 69 || 0.2 || 0.1 || 6.2 || 10.4 || 16.5 || 3.1 || 5.3 || 0
|-
| scope="row" text-align:center | 2019
| 
| 16 || 2 || 1 || 1 || 21 || 17 || 38 || 8 || 12 || 0.5 || 0.5 || 10.5 || 8.5 || 19.0 || 4.0 || 6.0 || 0
|- class="sortbottom"
! colspan=3 | Career
! 169
! 44
! 41
! 1483
! 1748
! 3231
! 590
! 974
! 0.3
! 0.2
! 8.8
! 10.3
! 19.1
! 3.5
! 5.8
! 21
|}

Honours and achievements
Individual
 John Worsfold Medal: 2012

References

External links

 

1990 births
Living people
West Coast Eagles players
Geelong Football Club players
Bendigo Pioneers players
Sandhurst Football Club players
John Worsfold Medal winners
Australian rules footballers from Bendigo
Perth Football Club players
East Perth Football Club players